Li Jiaman (born 18 August 1997) is a Chinese archer, who participated in the 2014 Summer Youth Olympics. She was the sole representative of the host-country China in the archery competition.

She won a gold medal with Filipino Luis Gabriel Moreno at the Youth Olympics at the mixed international team archery event. After the mixed international team event, Li won the girls' individual event gold medal round on a shoot-out against Melanie Gaubil of France.

Li's coach is 1996 Summer Olympics silver medalist He Ying.

References

External links
 World Archery biography
 Nanjing Youth Olympics 2014 biography
 
 

1997 births
Living people
Chinese female archers
Archers at the 2014 Summer Youth Olympics
Youth Olympic gold medalists for China
21st-century Chinese women